Jerécuaro is a Mexican city (and municipality) located in the lowlands of the state of Guanajuato. The municipality has an area of 828.3 square kilometres (2.7% of the surface of the state) and is bordered to the north by Apaseo el Alto, to the east by Coroneo and the state of Querétaro, to the south by Tarandacuao, to the southwest with Acámbaro, and to the northwest with Tarimoro.  The municipality had 55,311 inhabitants according to the 2005 census. The municipal president of Jerécuaro and its many smaller outlying communities is C.Jaime García Cardona.

Jerécuaro Township is located south of the state of Guanajuato. Its boundaries are defined as follows:

North : Apaseo el Alto
South : Tarandacuao
East: Coroneo
West: Tarimoro
Northwest: Tarimoro
Northeast : Querétaro 
Southwest: Acambaro
Southeast: Michoacán
Jerécuaro is connected to major cities of the entity that will provide optimal geographic location for business and tourist activities.

The various roads to cities of great importance to the municipality placed in a prime strategic location for investment:

Communities

History 
The origin of this community is pre-Hispanic, but was subjected to the Spanish Crown evangelized by the Indian chief Nicolas San Luis Montañés. Its legal foundation dates from 1572, under the administration of Bishop Fray Juan Medina Rincón, who erected the parish along the lines of what was done elsewhere Father Vasco de Quiroga. It was called San Miguel Jerécuaro in a file consisting of 1852 we realize that the municipality had that name. Jerécuaro, meaning “Place like home”. In 1910, at the time of the Revolution, the city was the seat of several revolutionary groups and federal troops of the Diaz government. In 1928, at the time of the Cristero uprising, was stationed an infantry battalion of the federal army, in a building located on the street that carries the name of Fray Angel Juárez. In the contours of the population many battles were staged. The city of Jerécuaro and Guadalupe Sanctuary at  El Calvario (Calvary).

In 1910, at the time of the Revolution, the city was the seat of several revolutionary groups and federal troops of the Diaz's government. In 1928, at the time of the Cristero uprising, was stationed an infantry battalion of the federal army, in a building located on the street that carries the name of Fray Angel Juárez. In the contours of the population many battles were staged.

Important figures of the municipality

Jose Aguilar and Maya, (1897-1966)- Politician and governor of Guanajuato
Benjamin Mendez Aguilar- Political
José Guadalupe Martínez Correa (1959-1998)- Biologist and former professor of younger generations
Benita Alcántar Carrillo, aedrian carii - Forming educational institutions in the town
Felipe Torres Patiño- A leading specialist in Medical Oncology
Gabino Gonzales Soto (1911-1987)- First music teacher and promoter of local wind bands
Jorge Hernández Muñoz, (1925-1995)- Composer and music teacher
Joseph Pisan and Ledezma, (1890-1963)- Lawyer and politician
Daniel Rico Patiño- Artist and painter
Maria Gonzalez Martinez- The municipal inspector
Raymundo Cornejo Lopez- Composer and music teacher

Anniversary and celebration

15 and 16 September
As in much of our national territory, Jerécuaro the traditional of “ Independencia”(Independence Day) also known as “El Grito de Dolores”,is carried out on the balcony of the town hall, like the kermes (Carnaval)  installed and fireworks are burned. The next day, the 16th, a parade is done by schools of different educational levels through the streets of the town. The streets are packed with people, all cheering and screaming,“Viva Mexico”, “Viva Miguel Hidalgo y Costilla”, “Viva la Independencia”.

September 23
Held since 1994, the founding of Jerécuaro, although recently created this celebration, a parade takes place to commemorate this occasion.

September 29
It celebrates “The Patron Saint of Jerécuaro”, San Miguel Archangel, the fair with rides, rodeos, Mexican dishes, Eucharistic celebrations and dances installed. Jerecuarenses attend these parties living in other parts of the country.

November 27
Jerecuarenses celebrate when the first rock was placed on the dam. The made this dam to provide irrigation to their crops. It is traditional for people to go with your family and friends to eat around the dam. Among the traditional dishes that are eaten are tamales de ceniza (tamales of ash), and roasted pork meat with red chile.

December 12 to 15
It celebrates The Virgin of Guadalupe, starts with happy birthday on the 12th, for the festivities the fair with rides, rodeos, Mexican dishes, Eucharistic celebrations and dances installed. A special mass is given before all the events. The mass takes place at “ El Calvario”. The festival culminates on the 15th with the Coronation of the Virgin in the Sanctuary of Calvary.

External links
Jerécuaro  
JERECUARO.COM

References

Municipalities of Guanajuato
Populated places in Guanajuato